Meromyza femorata  is a species of fly in the family Chloropidae. It is found in the  Palearctic .

References

Chloropinae
Insects described in 1835
Muscomorph flies of Europe
Taxa named by Pierre-Justin-Marie Macquart